A Makeover Story is a reality show on TLC Network in the United States.  Each episode ran for 30 minutes and featured two people who get makeovers including clothes, hairstyling, and makeup.  Richard Monahan was the executive producer of the premier season, which was the #1 rated daytime series for TLC. The show ran for five seasons and is the original of the "makeover show" formats.

In its later seasons, "A Makeover Story" added hosts in the form of fashion experts, featuring fashion consultant Dan Brickley, costume designer Alison Freer, hairstylist Moses Jones, and salon owner Gretchen Monahan.

References

Fashion-themed reality television series
TLC (TV network) original programming
Discovery Channel original programming